Donald R. Biggs (born April 7, 1965) is a Canadian retired professional ice hockey player.

His son, Tyler Biggs, was a first round draft pick of the Toronto Maple Leafs.

Early life
Biggs was raised in Mississauga, Ontario on Carrera Lane and attended Clarkson High School.

Playing career
As a youth, Biggs played in the 1978 Quebec International Pee-Wee Hockey Tournament with a minor ice hockey team from Mississauga.

Don Biggs was drafted from the OHL's Oshawa Generals by the Minnesota North Stars in the 1983 NHL Entry Draft. Biggs honed his pro game with their American Hockey League (AHL) team and was called up for one game with the North Stars. In 1985 Biggs' rights were traded to the Edmonton Oilers, but due to their talent-laden centre position with Wayne Gretzky and Mark Messier, Biggs at 20 years old, remained with their AHL affiliate in Nova Scotia. In 1987 Biggs signed with the Philadelphia Flyers and eventually played 12 games notching 2 goals.

While Biggs never managed to become a regular member of an NHL club, he was a valuable member and usually the captain of many minor league hockey teams in the OHL, AHL, IHL, ECHL, and a European professional hockey club. During his seasons with the Binghamton Rangers in 1992-93 Biggs set the AHL single-season scoring mark with 54 goals and 84 assists for 138 points. Biggs experienced his greatest success as Captain of the Cincinnati Cyclones from 1993–1999 and for a stint in 2002. During his time with the team he became a fan favorite and a local celebrity.

Biggs was also the on ice double for Patrick Swayze's skating scenes in the 1986 movie Youngblood.

Life after hockey
Don Biggs lives in Loveland, Ohio not far from Cincinnati. Biggs' number 22 jersey was retired in his honor and hung from the rafters of the local arena. He works for a local electrical supply company and is involved in local hockey programs, where he runs elite, private and team skill clinics as well as youth hockey clinics. He was the Head Coach and General Manager of the Queen City Steam in the Tier III junior hockey league, NA3HL from 2007 to 2013 when the team was sold and rebranded. He coached and mentored his son from squirt level in the local CAHA league to becoming the Captain of Team USA. (U17 & U18)

His son Tyler Biggs was taken 22nd overall in the 2011 NHL draft. Biggs last played professional hockey in spring 2019 for the Kalamazoo Wings of the ECHL.

Career statistics

References

External links
 

1965 births
Living people
Binghamton Rangers players
Canadian ice hockey centres
Cincinnati Cyclones (ECHL) players
Cincinnati Cyclones (IHL) players
Hershey Bears players
Minnesota North Stars draft picks
Minnesota North Stars players
Nova Scotia Oilers players
Oshawa Generals players
Sportspeople from Mississauga
People from Loveland, Ohio
Philadelphia Flyers players
Rochester Americans players
Salt Lake Golden Eagles (CHL) players
Springfield Indians players
Utah Grizzlies (IHL) players
Sportspeople from the Cincinnati metropolitan area
Canadian expatriate ice hockey players in the United States